Kean University is a public university in Union and Hillside, New Jersey. It is part of New Jersey's public system of higher education.

Kean University was founded in 1855 in Newark, New Jersey, as the Newark Normal School. Initially established for the exclusive purpose of being a teacher-education college it became New Jersey State Teachers College in 1937. In 1958, following a post-war boom of students and increasing demands for a more comprehensive curriculum, the college was relocated from Newark to Union Township, site of the Kean family's ancestral home at Liberty Hall. After its move to the historic Livingston-Kean Estate, which includes the entire Liberty Hall acreage, the historic James Townley House, and Kean Hall, which historically housed the library of United States Senator Hamilton Fish Kean and served as a political meeting place, the school became Newark State College, a comprehensive institution providing a full range of academic programs and majors.

Renamed Kean College of New Jersey in 1973, the institution earned university status on September 26, 1997, becoming Kean University of New Jersey. Kean University has subsequently grown to become the third largest institution of higher education in New Jersey and currently comprises five undergraduate colleges and the Nathan Weiss Graduate College. Kean University also hosts numerous research institutions, perhaps most prominently the New Jersey Center for Science, Technology and Mathematics, the Kean University Human Rights Institute, the Holocaust Resource Center, the Wynona Moore Lipman Ethnic Studies Center, and Liberty Hall. In recent years Kean has expanded to a satellite campus in Toms River, New Jersey, a campus in the Skylands of New Jersey and has a foreign campus in Wenzhou, China.

History

Livingston-Kean Estate

Livingston, Hamilton, and the American Revolution
The building of the estate on which Kean University is situated was begun in 1760, when lawyer William Livingston, who would become New Jersey's first elected governor (on August 31, 1776) and a Revolutionary War patriot and signer of the United States Constitution, bought  in then-Connecticut Farms and Elizabethtown, New Jersey, across the river from his New York home, in hopes of establishing a country residence. By 1772, extensive grounds, gardens, and orchards had been developed and a 14-room Georgian-style house had been built under the supervision of Livingston. In its first year of occupancy the new house, christened Liberty Hall, was resided in by Livingston and Alexander Hamilton. In 1773, Livingston moved to the home with his wife, Susannah French of New Brunswick, and their children, full-time.

Liberty Hall suffered damage from the Revolutionary War by both British and American troops, the property having been central to the major Revolutionary development, the Battle of Connecticut Farms. The property was restored and Livingston continued to maintain the gardens and grounds as governor until his 1790 death. The estate passed to Livingston's son, future Associate Justice of the United States Supreme Court Henry Brockholst Livingston. In 1798, the house was sold to George Belasise, Lord Bolingbroke and his wife Isabella. The new owners established an English boxwood maze that still stands today and made extensive additions to the principal outbuildings of the property, established or improved a large hot house, and developed the gardens, introducing rare shrubs and trees to the grounds, and possibly laying out the grounds west of the mansion.

In 1811, the Kean family acquired the Livingston estate when Peter Kean purchased Liberty Hall in trust for his mother Susan Livingston Kean Niemcewicz (women not being eligible to own property in their own right at the time). Susan Livingston Kean, a niece of Governor Livingston, was the widow of John Kean, a Continental Congress delegate and advocate for the ratification of the Constitution in South Carolina who served as the first cashier of the Bank of the United States. Having died from a respiratory disease that developed as a result of being held prisoner of war at sea during the Revolution, Kean died at 39 and Susan Livingston Kean remarried to Count Julian Niemcewicz, a Polish nobleman who fled Poland after fighting unsuccessfully for Polish independence from Russia but returned in the wake of Napoleon's successful campaigns. To honor her second husband Susan Kean changed the name of Liberty Hall to Ursino, the name of Niemcewicz's Polish estate. Peter Kean, the only son of Susan and John Kean, who married Sarah Sabina Morris, a granddaughter of Lewis Morris, the first royal governor of New Jersey, and served as colonel of the Fourth Regiment of New Jersey and an escort of Lafayette on his tour of New Jersey predeceased his mother. His son, John Kean II, inherited Liberty Hall. John Kean II, who served on the staff of Governor Pennington with the rank of colonel, was an original stockholder of the Camden and Amboy Railroad, served as the first president of the Elizabeth and Somerville Railroad, as a vice president of the Central Railroad of New Jersey, as president of the National Bank of New Jersey, as president of the Elizabethtown Gaslight Company (later known as Elizabethtown Gas Company) and Elizabethtown Water Company lived at Liberty Hall for 60 years and made the most dramatically significant changes to the house and property in its history, transforming the house into a 50-room Victorian Italianate structure.

Another John Kean, son of John Kean II and Lucinetta Halsted Kean ("Lucy Kean"), inherited the estate after their deaths. John Kean served in the United States House of Representatives from 1883 to 1885, and again from 1887 to 1889, and in the United States Senate from 1899 to 1911. Senator Kean lived at Liberty Hall when not in Washington, D.C. and held annual New Year's receptions for his political supporters at the estate. After the death of Senator John Kean the house passed to his nephew, Captain John Kean, a National Guard cavalryman and president of the National State Bank, the Elizabethtown Water Company, and the Elizabethtown Consolidated Gas Company. Captain John Kean was the son of Katharine Winthrop Kean and United States Senator Hamilton Fish Kean whose library was housed at Kean Hall, a building constructed for that specific purpose in 1912. A frequent political meeting place in the first years of its life, Kean Hall now houses the undergraduate admissions office and administrative offices including the Presidential Suite and the conference room for the Kean University Board of Trustees. Captain John Kean's wife, Mary Alice Barney Kean, a historian and preservationist, was the last resident of Liberty Hall and was responsible for much of its preservation.

Historic non-residents associated with Liberty Hall
Liberty Hall has had many distinguished visitors, including Martha Washington, who stayed at Liberty Hall during her husband's inauguration and President George Washington who visited his wife there not long after his swearing-in in New York City. Supreme Court Chief Justice John Jay was married to Governor Livingston's daughter, Sarah, at Liberty Hall. Other guests included Lewis Morris, Lafayette, Elias Boudinot, and several presidents after Washington, including Ulysses S. Grant, William Howard Taft, Herbert Hoover, Gerald Ford, George H. W. Bush, and Bill Clinton.

Newark Normal School

Kean University was founded in April 1855 in Newark, New Jersey as the Newark Normal School, a Saturday morning school initially established for the exclusive purpose of being a teacher-education college for the educators of the city of Newark. The university was founded by Stephen Congar, Newark's Superintendent of Schools, who founded the Newark Normal School with the goal of ensuring the continued improvement of the city's schools through quality teaching. The academy was designed to improve the skills of teachers that Congar correctly viewed as lacking in formal training. Newark Normal School was the first Normal School created in New Jersey, and one of the earliest in the nation, with an inaugural class of 85 students, mostly women and primarily Newark High School alumni.

Most of the college's first students were white, middle class, Protestants. Classes continued during the Civil War, but the numbers of men enrolled declined as young men joined the Union Army. Following the Union victory in the war, increasing numbers of Catholics, largely the children of immigrants, began to enroll beginning the school's theme of a diverse student body that would continue to evolve over the next 150 years; by 1911 the children of immigrants exceeded thirty percent of the student body; since that time, Kean University has become one of the nation's most diverse schools. In 1863 the Normal School students became formally required to teach in Newark Public Schools after graduation. In 1879 the Normal School program was extended to one year, and in 1888 to two years. The first classes of the Normal School met at Newark High School, then located on Washington and Linden Streets in Newark. In 1878, the Normal School moved to the Market Street School for about two decades before moving back to Newark High School in 1899. In 1898 the curriculum of the college was radically revised in an effort to have teachers "professionalized" and enhance the status of the institution.

New Jersey State Normal School
In 1913 the state took control of the college and the School was renamed the New Jersey State Normal School at Newark. The School moved to a new building at Fourth Street and Belleville Avenue (later Broadway Avenue) that year. In 1917, during World War I, the Normal School faculty and students worked in war-related fundraising and relief efforts.

In the following decade the Normal School raised its standards further, as evidenced by a 1925 announcement that "students who are deficient in spelling...will be dropped from the school" and by the 1928 extension of the Normal School program to three years. The Great Depression brought challenges for the School as enrollment and the overall number of teachers hired in New Jersey declined sharply. In 1934 a great milestone was reached when the Normal School became a four-year college and the State Board of Education authorized the Normal School to grant bachelor's degrees – Bachelor of Science in education.

New Jersey State Teachers College
In 1937 the college was renamed the New Jersey State Teachers College at Newark and remained in the Broadway building until 1958, when it moved to the current Union Township, New Jersey campus.

Impact of World War II
The Second World War brought sweeping changes to the college with some 300 students serving in the armed forces and seven Newark State students losing their lives on active duty. During the war, President Roy L. Shaffer pledged to keep the college "rolling" as part of the "moral and intellectual defense" of the nation.

The accelerating changes during World War II altered the nature of the college as its students, faculty, and curriculum became more diverse, the campus underwent physical changes, and the student body changed dramatically. One young veteran, writing home from occupied Germany, predicted that the college would see a lot more men's faces after the war, which turned out to be very accurate; the education benefits offered under the GI Bill of Rights drove men to apply at unprecedented levels, including more African-American students.

As the post-war Baby Boom generated a large demand for new teachers, the college found itself broadening in the face of student desires for a broader curriculum that quickly expanded to encompass the liberal arts and sciences, the professions, and graduate education. While the college maintained a focus on educating teachers it was quickly developing itself into a comprehensive institution. By the early 1950s, post-war growth had severely strained the college's facilities, causing a need for a new campus.

Newark State College
The purchase of the Kean Estate in Union Township, then called the "Green Lane Farm", allowed for a new campus in 1958 at the site of the Kean family's ancestral home at Liberty Hall. The following year, in 1959, the institution changed its name to Newark State College, completing its transformation from a college of education to a comprehensive institute of higher education.

President Eugene Wilkins retired in 1969, following the successful transition of the college from Newark to Union and the successful inaugural years of Newark State College. Wilkins was succeeded by Dr. Nathan Weiss, for whom the Nathan Weiss Graduate College is named. Weiss was committed to wide access to higher education, especially for first-generation college students, while fostering vastly expanded new programs in the sciences, health cares, business, and academic and administrative computing. Weiss led the school to its status as a multi-purpose institution.

Kean College of New Jersey
In 1973, Newark State College was renamed Kean College of New Jersey for the Kean family whose members include Congressman Robert Winthrop Kean; U.S. Congressman and U.S. Senator John Kean of New Jersey; former New Jersey Governor and 9/11 Commission (Kean Commission) Chairman Thomas Kean Sr.; U.S. Senator Hamilton Fish Kean; Julia Kean, the wife of US Secretary of State and New York Governor Hamilton Fish; First Lady of the United States Anna Symmes Harrison; New Jersey State Senator and United States Senate nominee Thomas Kean Jr.; and John Kean of South Carolina, delegate to the Continental Congress.

Dr. Elsa Gomez became the first female president of Kean College in 1989 and served until 1994. By the 1990s the student body of Kean College was among the most diverse in New Jersey. The academic quality of the institution improved towards the end of the 20th century as more members of the faculty, in rapidly escalating numbers, pursued teaching innovations, original scholarship and research, and external grants and funding. By the time Kean College of New Jersey became a university in 1997, under President Ronald L. Applbaum, the institution had achieved a higher level of academic and public recognition.

Kean University
Becoming Kean University of New Jersey on September 26, 1997, Kean soon added the Nathan Weiss Graduate College. In 2003, Dawood Farahi was elected president of Kean University by the unanimous vote of the board of trustees.

Kean University has grown to become the third largest institution of higher education in the State of New Jersey, after Rutgers University and Montclair State University. In recent years, besides its campuses in Union and Hillside, New Jersey, the university has recently completed additional expansions to Toms River, New Jersey, which houses an Ocean County satellite campus, as well as the People's Republic of China. In 2006, the university announced that it was seeking approval from the Chinese and U.S. educational governing bodies to be the first American university to open an extensive University campus on Chinese soil. The new campus is located in Wenzhou, Zhejiang Province, one of the richest, fastest growing Chinese provinces. The Chinese campus has a growing student body.

In 2009, the administration unveiled a major reorganization plan touted as the "first step" in privatizing the university. Faculty reacted negatively to the plan, including a 2010 vote of "no confidence." One year later, the university's president, Dawood Farahi came under scrutiny from the Kean Federation of Teachers leadership who accused him of multiple errors on his resumes. After hiring an independent law firm to review Farahi's resume, the Board of Trustees of Kean University voted 7-4 (with one abstention) to retain him as president of the university. The following year, in April 2012, the NCAA accused the university of "major violations" and placed all of its sports teams on probation. This turmoil attracted the attention of the university's regional accreditor who initially demanded answers from the university in 2011 and briefly placed the university on probation in 2012.

On May 11, 2020, Lamont Repollet, Ed.D., was selected as the 18th president of Kean University by the Kean University Board of Trustees.

Names over the years
 1855 Newark Normal School
 1913 New Jersey State Normal School
 1934 New Jersey State Teachers College at Newark
 1959 Newark State College
 1973 Kean College of New Jersey
 1997 Kean University

Academics and Research

Colleges and Schools 
Kean University offers more than 50 undergraduate programs and over 60 doctoral, master's and certificate programs in its seven colleges:

The College of Business and Public Management
Global Business School
School of Accounting and Finance
School of Criminal Justice and Public Administration
School of Management and Marketing
Small Business Development Center

The College of Education
Office of Teacher Certification and Alternate Route Programs
School of Curriculum and Teaching
School of Special Education and Literacy

The College of Liberal Arts
School of Communication, Media and Journalism
School of English Studies
School of Fine and Performing Arts
School of General Studies
School of Psychology
Department of History
School of Social Sciences
Center for Interdisciplinary Studies

The Dorothy and George Hennings College of Science, Mathematics and Technology
School of Integrative Sciences and Technology
Department of Applied Mathematics
Department of Biological Sciences
Department of Chemistry and Physics
Department of Computer Science and Technology
Department of Environmental and Sustainability Sciences

Michael Graves College, Architecture and Design
School of Public Architecture
Robert Busch School of Design

The College of Health Professions and Human Services
School of Nursing
School of Health and Human Performance
Department of Genetic Counseling
School of Physical Therapy
Department of Occupational Therapy
School of Communication Disorders and Deafness
Department of Athletic Training
School of Clinical Psychology
Department of Counselor Education
Department of Graduate Social Work

Education program
Kean University has a Teaching College. While maintaining its significant role in the training of teachers, Kean has become a comprehensive institution and served 15,939 students in fall, 2010.

Research institutions

Kean hosts research institutions including the Kean University Holocaust Resource Center, the New Jersey Center for Science, Technology and Mathematics (NJ STEM), the Kean University Human Rights Institute, and the Liberty Hall Museum National Historic Landmark.

Campuses

Main Union Township Campus
Union Township houses the university's Main Campus and Liberty Hall Campus in Union and its East Campus in Hillside.
The main campus is located in Union Township, New Jersey.

Main Campus

The Main Campus of the Union Township campus is located in Union, New Jersey and contains most of the university's buildings and institutions, the university residence halls and residence life, and is the main center of undergraduate activity. The main campus is the location of the undergraduate colleges, most academic halls, the administration buildings, Kean Hall castle, Nancy Thompson Library, the Holocaust Resource Center, the Human Rights Institute, the University Center, the Maxine and Jack Lane Center for Academic Success, the Karl and Helen Burger Gallery, the Nancy Dryfoos Gallery, Wilkins Theatre, Zella Fry Theatre, and the Little Theatre. The Main Campus also hosts the majority of the dining facilities and places to purchase university and commercial food and drink, thought the other campuses do offer some similar facilities; all resident students reside on the Main Campus. Alumni Stadium and Harwood Arena are located on the Main Campus. The New Jersey Center for Science, Mathematics, and Technology (NJCSMT or NJ STEM) is located across Morris Avenue from most of the Main Campus, next to the university's Liberty Hall Campus.

Liberty Hall Campus
The Liberty Hall Campus in Union houses the National Historic Landmark Liberty Hall Museum, as well as the Liberty Hall Carriage House, the Liberty Hall Fire Company, and the surrounding gardens and orchards.

East Campus
The East Campus is located behind the Liberty Hall Campus in Hillside, New Jersey, in the former Pingry School and hosts the East Campus Building and Nathan Weiss Graduate College as well as additional athletic fields, gyms, a cafe, and the Ruth Horowitz Alumni House.

Ocean County

A campus in Toms River, New Jersey, called Kean Ocean is currently in operation and is temporarily housed at Ocean County College until the new campus is built. The new building is called the Gateway building which opened in December 2012.

Wenzhou-Kean University
Kean University originally planned to open a campus in Wenzhou, in the Zhejiang Province of the People's Republic of China in 2007. Kean University-Wenzhou would have been China's first full-scale American-style university, but the plans became caught up in red tape in the Beijing government. In 2012 the issues were resolved and Kean officials traveled to China to break ground on this joint venture.
2016 produced the first graduates from Wenzhou-Kean University, and in 2018 the graduating class included 381 graduates.

Skylands Campus 
The Skylands Campus also known as Kean Skylands, is the newest addition of the Kean University expansions. It is located in the Oak Ridge section of Jefferson, an hour's drive from the main campus.

Athletics
The university's athletic teams are known as the Cougars and the school colors are navy, white, and Columbia blue. Kean competes at the NCAA Division III level in 14 sports as a member of the New Jersey Athletic Conference (NJAC) for most sports while men's volleyball competes as a member of the Continental Volleyball Conference (CVC) and men's lacrosse competes in the Coastal Lacrosse Conference (CLC).

On May 29, 2007, Kean University won their first Division III College World Series, winning the national title in baseball. In 2011, the NCAA alleged that the university had committed several violations of NCAA rules. Consequently, the university instituted a self-imposed ban on post-season play for Fall 2011 for the men's soccer, women's soccer, and women's volleyball teams. In April 2012, the NCAA concluded that "major violations" had occurred, and that all 13 varsity athletic teams would be on probation until April 2016, that the women's basketball team would be banned from post-season play in 2013. The NCAA also mandated that all records for the 2010-11 women's basketball team be vacated.

In addition to the varsity sports, Kean university also sponsors intramural sports such as basketball, dodgeball, kickball, flag football, indoor soccer, and volleyball.

Men's Sports
Baseball
Basketball
Football
Lacrosse
Soccer
Volleyball

Women's Sports
Basketball
Field hockey
Lacrosse
Soccer
Softball
Swimming
Tennis
Volleyball

Kean Alumni Stadium
Located on the main campus, Kean Alumni Stadium is a multipurpose athletic facility that serves as home for the university's football, field hockey, men's and women's soccer, men's and women's lacrosse, and men's and women's track and field teams.

The stadium, which seats 5,400 people, features a Sprinturf field as well as an eight-lane synthetic surface track, was constructed in 1998, on the site formerly known as Zweidinger Field.

Harwood Arena
The Harwood Arena opened in 2006. It features a basketball court, indoor track, Athletic Hall of Fame, concession stand, ticket sales, locker rooms, and faculty and staff offices. At game time, bleacher seating is available to 3,200 Cougar fans.

Greek life and student organizations

Greek life 
Fraternities: Alpha Phi Alpha, Beta Kappa Psi, Iota Phi Theta, Kappa Alpha Psi, Lambda Sigma Upsilon, Lambda Theta Phi, Omega Psi Phi, Phi Beta Sigma, Psi Sigma Phi, Nu Delta Pi, Nu Sigma Phi, Sigma Beta Tau, Sigma Lambda Beta, Sigma Theta Chi, Tau Kappa Epsilon, Alpha Delta Gamma, Gamma Psi Epsilon. Lambda Upsilon Lambda

Sororities: Delta Phi Epsilon, Alpha Kappa Alpha, Beta Kappa Sigma, Delta Sigma Theta, Kappa Delta Tau, Lambda Chi Rho, Lambda Tau Omega, Lambda Theta Alpha, Mu Sigma Upsilon, Nu Theta Chi, Omega Sigma Psi, Sigma Beta Chi, Sigma Gamma Rho, Theta Phi Alpha, Zeta Phi Beta, Omega Phi Chi

Student organizations 
Student Organization of Kean University is the Full-Time Undergraduate governing body of Kean University. This student government provides programs for students to address student concerns about the university. They also provide funding to a large number of student groups.

Other clubs and arts programs
In addition to athletics, Kean University has a variety of clubs available for students to join. Kean is also the home of Premiere Stages, a professional theatre company that works with Kean students in the production of its plays.

Demographics

Kean University is a census-designated place (CDP) covering the residential population of Kean University's Main, Liberty Hall, and East campuses in Union County.

It first appeared as a CDP in the 2020 Census with a population of 1,522. The CDP population consists of those resident at the time of the census and will differ from the population of the student body.

2020 census

Note: the US Census treats Hispanic/Latino as an ethnic category. This table excludes Latinos from the racial categories and assigns them to a separate category. Hispanics/Latinos can be of any race.

Notable alumni and staff

References

External links

Official website
Official athletics website

 
Educational institutions established in 1855
Public universities
Hillside, New Jersey
Union Township, Union County, New Jersey
Universities and colleges in Union County, New Jersey
Former Major League Lacrosse venues
Public universities and colleges in New Jersey
1855 establishments in New Jersey